Cycloptilum squamosum, known generally as the Scudder's scaly cricket or Scudder's scaly bush cricket, is a species of scaly cricket in the family Mogoplistidae. It is found in North America.

References

Crickets
Articles created by Qbugbot
Insects described in 1869